Pandit Vinayak Malharrao Torvi, (born 4 September 1948) is an Indian classical vocalist. He belongs to the Gwalior and Kirana gharanas (singing styles).

Early life and training 
Pandit Vinayak Torvi was born on 4 September 1948 in Ranebennur, in Karnataka. His father Malharrao Torvi was a Harikatha (musical discourse) exponent.
He developed a passion for music, while listening to and accompanying his father during discourses. He started formal musical education at the age of 9 under Tammanna Gurav and then under Narayanacharya Dandapur.

Pandit ji received training in Hindustani classical vocal music for 15 years in Gurukul (a traditional system of learning employed in various disciplines throughout India), first from Gururao Deshpande, and later from Bhimsen Joshi of the Kirana gharana.

Pandit ji received further reinforcement from musical greats such as Gangubai Hangal, Mallikarjun Mansur and Basavraj Rajguru during his PG studies in music at Karnataka University, Dharwad.

Career 
Pandit ji's career started in 1960, as he started performing in music concerts and winning various state and national level music competitions. In the early 1970s  he earned a bachelor's degree in music from Karnataka University Dharwad.

In 1976, Pandit ji became A graded artiste of All India Radio. At around the same time, in the late 70s, he earned his Masters in classical music from Karnataka University.
Pandit Vinayak Torvi worked for Canara Bank.
In 1980 Pandit ji performed in his first major national level concert, a music conference organised by ITC at Hubli. He later served on the board of Karnataka state Sangeet Nritya Academy for two consecutive terms.

In 1983 Pandit ji established Gururao Deshpande Sangeet Sabha in Bangalore, which was inaugurated by the musician Gangubai Hangal.

In 1991-92, Pandit ji toured England, Scotland, and France for concert and lecture cum demonstrations. This tour was sponsored by the Indian Council for Cultural Relations (ICCR). 
Since 1985, Pandit Vinayak Torvi has performed at several music conferences., Tansen Festival, ITC SRA Kolkata among others. He was named artist of the month, by ITC SRA. 
Since 1991, Torvi has toured abroad, for concerts and lectures, demonstrations in various countries such as  USA, England, Australia, Gulf countries etc. 

His music has been greatly appreciated by people worldwide.

Awards and recognition 

Surmani from SurSingar Sansad, Mumbai - 1982-83
Rajyostav Award, Government of Karnataka - 1990
Chowdiah Memorial Award, Bangalore  - 02.11.1996
Shruthi Sagara, Vasundhara Performing Arts Center, Mysore - 20.12.2004
Swara Sadhana award from Ratna Swara Sadhana Samithi, Mumbai - 05.03.2005
Kirana Gharana Award from Music Forum, Mumbai - 05.01.2006
Sangeetya Puravankara Puraskar from Sangeet Asthan, Bangalore - 18.11.2006
Nadashree Award from Hindustani Kalakar Mandali, Bangalore - 15.11.2008
Chandrahasa Award from Sangeet Seva Samithi, Sorab -  07.02.2009
Aryabhatta Prashasti, Aryabhatta Cultural Organization, Bangalore - 02.04.2011
Karnataka Kala Tilaka, Sangeet Nritya Academy, Karnataka State
Celebrity Artiste of SRA, Kolkata.
Parishath Puraskara, Karnataka Gana Kala Parishath, Bangalore.
Gaayana Gandharva from KGF Music Association.

References 

1948 births
20th-century Indian male classical singers
Living people
Gwalior gharana
Singers from Karnataka
Recipients of the Sangeet Natak Akademi Award
People from Haveri district
20th-century Khyal singers